William Townsend Aiton FRHS FLS (2 February 1766 – 9 October 1849) was an English botanist. He was born at Kew on 2 February 1766, the eldest son of William Aiton.

He brought out a second and enlarged edition of the Hortus Kewensis in 1810–1813, a catalogue of the plants at Kew Gardens, the first edition of which was written by his father William Aiton. Aiton succeeded his father as director at Kew Gardens in 1793 and was commissioned by George IV to lay out the gardens at the Royal Brighton Pavilion and at Buckingham Palace Garden.

Aiton was one of the founders and an active fellow of the Royal Horticultural Society.

He retired in 1841 but remained living at Kew, although passing much of his time with his brother at Kensington where he died on 9 October 1849. He is buried at Kew.

References

Further reading
 Pagmenta, Frank (2009) The Aitons: Gardeners to their Majesties. Richmond Local History Society. .

 

18th-century British botanists
English gardeners
English horticulturists
1766 births
1849 deaths
Fellows of the Linnean Society of London
Royal Botanic Gardens, Kew
People from Kew, London
19th-century British botanists